An electrode array is a configuration of electrodes used for measuring either an electric current or voltage. Some electrode arrays can operate in a bidirectional fashion, in that they can also be used to provide a stimulating pattern of electric current or voltage.

Common arrays include:
Schlumberger (Wenner)
Wenner alpha
Wenner beta
Wenner gamma
Pole-pole
Dipole-dipole
Pole-dipole
Equatorial dipole-dipole

Resistivity
Resistivity measurement of bulk materials is a frequent application of electrode arrays.  The figure shows a Wenner array, one of the possible ways of achieving this.  Injecting the current through electrodes separate from those being used for measurement of potential has the advantage of eliminating any inaccuracies caused by the injecting circuit resistance, particularly the contact resistance between the probe and the surface, which can be high.  Assuming the material is homogenous, the resistivity in the Wenner array is given by:

where  is the distance between probes.

Electrode arrays are widely used to measure resistivity in geophysics applications.  It is also used in the semiconductor industry to measure the bulk resistivity of silicon wafers, which in turn can be taken as a measure of the doping that has been applied to the wafer, before further manufacturing processes are undertaken.

See also
Four-terminal sensing
Electrical resistivity measurement of concrete

References

Karl Lark-Horovitz, Vivian Annabelle Johnson, Methods of experimental physics: Solid state physics, Academic Press, 1959 .

John Milsom, Field geophysics, John Wiley and Sons, 2003 .

Geophysical imaging